Kristiāns Pelšs (9 September 1992 – 11 June 2013) was a Latvian ice hockey player. He was the son of poet and translator Einārs Pelšs. At the time of his death, he played for the Oklahoma City Barons of the American Hockey League (AHL) as a prospect of the Edmonton Oilers of the National Hockey League.

Kristians Pelss Memorial Award

This award is handed out to the player who best exemplifies the traits of late Oil Kings forward Kristians Pelss, a former WHL champion with the Oil Kings and Edmonton Oilers draft pick.  He was known for his commitment to hard work on the ice, as well as his dedication to be a great teammate and member of our community off the ice.

Playing career
Pelšs was selected by the Edmonton Oilers in the 7th round (181st overall) of the 2010 NHL Entry Draft. He made his European Elite debut with DHK Latgale of the Belarusian Extraleague during the 2008-09 season. In 2010, he moved to North America and signed to play major junior hockey in the Western Hockey League (WHL) with the Edmonton Oil Kings.

Pelšs participated at the 2012 World Junior Ice Hockey Championships as a member of the Latvia men's national junior ice hockey team.

On 1 May 2012, it was announced that Pelšs signed a three-year entry level contract with the Edmonton Oilers.

Death
On 11 June 2013, Pelšs drowned in the Daugava River after leaping from the Stone Bridge in Riga, Latvia. It was confirmed that Pelšs' death was accidental.

Career statistics

International

See also
List of ice hockey players who died during their playing career

References

External links

1992 births
2013 deaths
Edmonton Oil Kings players
Edmonton Oilers draft picks
HK Liepājas Metalurgs players
Latvian ice hockey forwards
Oklahoma City Barons players
People from Preiļi
Stockton Thunder players
Deaths by drowning
Accidental deaths in Latvia